Route 162 is a state highway in the Missouri Bootheel. Its western terminus is at Route 25 in Clarkton, Dunklin County, and the route travels eastward to nearby towns of Gideon and Portageville, where it intersects U.S. Route 61 (US 61) and Interstate 55 (I-55). The road then continues through rural New Madrid County and ends at a boat ramp near the Mississippi River.

The route was designated in 1956 to replace two supplemental routes that extended from Clarkton to Portageville. The route was fully paved in the same year, and an interchange was built at I-55 by 1967.

Route description
In 2015, Missouri Department of Transportation (MoDOT) calculated as many as 1,888 vehicles traveling on Route 162 west of Route 153, and as few as 252 vehicles traveling east of Route M. This is expressed in terms of annual average daily traffic (AADT), a measure of traffic volume for any average day of the year.

The route is located in Dunklin and New Madrid counties. The route starts at a T-intersection with Route 25 on the western edge of Clarkton. It travels on the northern side of the city, and leaves city limits and Dunklin County past Shelton Drive. The road enters New Madrid County and travels through a small section of farmland before entering the city of Gideon. In the northern side of the city, the route meets Route 153 at a T-intersection, and it travels southward concurrently with Route 153. At Fourth Street, Route 162 travels eastward, ending the concurrency. The route passes by the entrance of the Gideon Memorial Airport, before leaving the city at County Road 279 (CRD 279). At CRD 268, the road begins to travel southeastward until it reaches CRD 272, crossing several streams along the way. Route B becomes concurrent with Route 162, crossing a river and intersecting two county roads before continuing southwards. The route crosses the Little River past CRD 357. At McCrate Avenue, Route 162 enters Portageville. The road travels across the northern part of the city, intersecting city streets and Route F. After crossing over the River Subdivision railroad, the road meets US 61 at a T-intersection and becomes concurrent. Both US 61 and Route 162 travel southwestward until the road reaches Main Street. At this point, US 61 and Route 162 travel eastward and crosses over the Portage Bayou, while Route T begins travelling southward.
Just outside of Portageville, the road meets I-55 at a diamond interchange, and US 61 continues its concurrency with I-55. Route 162 continues eastward through rural New Madrid County. East of CRD 427, the road intersects the termini of Routes KK and TT. At Route M, Route 162 begins travelling southwestwards toward the Mississippi River. CRD 439 is the last intersection before the road ends at a boat ramp near the river.

History
Around 1932, Routes C and K were designated along gravel roads in the Missouri Bootheel. Route C connected from Route 25 in Clarkton to Gideon, while Route K was from Portageville to near the Mississippi River. Route K was extended southeastward one year later, intersecting the newly designated Route M. Route C was extended east of Gideon in 1935, and its section from Clarkton to Gideon was paved one year later. The section of Route C east of Gideon was paved by 1949, and the route was extended eastward by 1953. Route K was also paved during that time. By 1954, Route C was extended along a gravel road to Portageville, connecting with US 61 and Route K. In 1956, Route 162 was designated, replacing Routes C and K. The remaining gravel section and was paved that year. An interchange at I-55 was being built during 1967, and it was completed later that year. The project was part of the I-55 extension from New Madrid to Portageville, with a total cost of $6,375,556 in 1966.

Major intersections

References

External links

162
Transportation in Dunklin County, Missouri
Transportation in New Madrid County, Missouri